Boghom (also known as Bogghom, Bohom, Burom, Burum, Burrum; the Hausa people calls it Burmawa, Borrom, Boghorom, Bokiyim) is an Afro-Asiatic language spoken by the majority of people in Kanam & Wase local government of Plateau State, Nigeria.

The Boghom people are mostly farmers, though some of them engage in rearing animals. Historically, hunting was a major occupation of the people as well.

Boghom is one of eight languages featured in Ronald Cosper's Barawa Lexicon:  Jimi, Zul, Geji, Polci, Dott, Sayanci, Buli and Boghom. Joshua Project has it that the population of Bogghom speakers is 162,000.

Notes

External links 
OLAC resources in and about the Boghom language
South Bauchi word lists in Wiktionary Appendix

West Chadic languages
Languages of Nigeria